The Shiromani Akali Dal (1920) is a political party in India led by former Speaker of Punjab Vidhan Sabha, Ravi Inder Singh.

See also
Splinter groups of the Akali Dal

References

Political parties established in 1920
Sikh political parties
Regionalist parties in India

1920 establishments in India
Organisations based in Chandigarh